Myanmar Maritime University (MMU), located in Thanlyin in the outskirts of Yangon, is the premier university of maritime education in Myanmar. MMU offers 5-year bachelor's degree programs. Starting from 2012, MMU, administered by the Ministry of Transportation, offers two-year post-graduate diplomas in various marine and naval disciplines. In 2007, the school had about 1,800 graduate students, pursuing international STCW-95-standards compliant maritime education.

History
MMU was officially established on 10 June 2002 by the military government per the Myanmar Maritime University Act (The State Peace and Development Council Law No. 1/2002). The official mission of MMU is to "produce well competent qualified naval architects, engineers and scientists". On 1 August 2002, the university first opened its doors inside the compound of Yangon Institute of Marine Technology, in Sinmalike, Yangon. Since March 2004, the university has been relocated to its present purpose-built campus in Thanlyin near Thilawa port, the country's largest port.

Admissions
MMU is one of the most selective universities in the country. Admissions are based primarily on the marks received in the Burmese university entrance examination (Matriculation Exam). The university does maintain a 20% quota of female students in its annual student intake, and all students must pass an eyesight exam. As many of the graduates receive job offers from foreign shipping firms, admission to the university is highly competitive. In 2006, the minimum university entrance exam score necessary to be admitted was 458 out of 600 marks (up from 443 marks in 2005) despite an increase in admissions to 450 students per year from 350 the year earlier. In 2008, the admission marks were 473 out of 600.The minimum entrance mark is 491 out of 600 in 2010.

Programs

Since 2012, MMU offers six six-year bachelor's degree programs and two two-year post-graduate diplomas. Last batch of students with 5-year degree will  graduated in 2017 February. 
The university's syllabus, coursework and practical training are in keeping with the standards of Training, Certification and Watchkeeping for Seafarers 1995 (STCW), an international convention developed by the International Maritime Organization that sets qualifications and training standards for personnel serving aboard seagoing merchant ships.

Engineering

First Year:  Myanmar, English, Engineering Mathematics, Engineering Chemistry, Engineering Physics, Computer Science.
Second Year:  NA, ME, EE, PH, RC, MM—English, Engineering Mathematics, Computer Science, Mechanical Engineering Drawing, Applied Electrical Engineering (NA, MM, ME, PH, RC), Workshop, Engineering Mechanics, Marine Engineering Knowledge (ME, EE), Theoretical Electronics 1 (EE)
Third Year (ME major): English, Fluid Mechanics, General Engineering Knowledge, Mechanical Drawing, Thermodynamics 1, Strength of Materials, Naval Architecture 1, Engineering Mathematics 1, Engineering Mathematics 2

Post-graduate studies
The university offers two year post-graduate diplomas in shipping management and port management for part-time, and three one-year post-graduate diplomas in shipping management, port management, and transport and logistics management for full-time studies.

Administration

List of rectors
 Thein Tun (2002–2007)
 Dr. Charlie Than (2007–2013)
 Dr. Myat Lwin (2013–present)

Main departments
 Department of Naval Architecture and Ocean Engineering
 Department of Marine Engineering
 Department of Port and Harbour Engineering
 Department of River and Coastal Engineering
 Department of Marine Electrical Systems and Electronics
 Department of Marine Mechanical Engineering
 Department of Nautical Science
 Department of Shipping Management
 Department of Port Management

Supporting departments
 Department of Myanmar
 Department of Computer Science
 Department of English
 Department of Engineering Mathematics
 Department of Engineering Chemistry
 Department of Engineering Physics
 Department of Workshop Technology

Affiliated academic institutions
MMU maintains affiliations with the following academic institutions:

Domestic
 Yangon Technological University
 Defence Services Technological Academy
 University of East Yangon
 Technological University, Thanlyin
 Yangon University

International
 Korea Maritime University, 
 Shanghai Maritime University, 
 Dalian Maritime University, 
 Tokyo University of Marine Science and Technology, 
 Burapha University, 
 National Taiwan Ocean University, 
 Shanghai Ocean University, 
 World Maritime University,

References

Universities and colleges in Thanlyin
Universities and colleges in Yangon Region
Technological universities in Myanmar
Universities and colleges in Myanmar
2002 establishments in Myanmar
Educational institutions established in 2002